The 2020 UCI Asia Tour was the 16th season of the UCI Asia Tour. The season has begun on 2 November 2019 with the Tour de Singkarak and ended on 11 October 2020.

The points leader, based on the cumulative results of previous races, wears the UCI Asia Tour cycling jersey.

Throughout the season, points are awarded to the top finishers of stages within stage races and the final general classification standings of each of the stages races and one-day events. The quality and complexity of a race also determines how many points are awarded to the top finishers, the higher the UCI rating of a race, the more points are awarded.

The UCI ratings from highest to lowest are as follows:
 Multi-day events: 2.Pro, 1.Pro, 2.1, 2.2 and 1.2

Events

2019

2020

Final standings

Individual classification

Team classification

Nation classification

References

External links
 

 
2020
UCI Asia Tour
UCI